Sogliano Cavour is a town and comune in the Italian province of Lecce in the Apulia region of south-east Italy.

References

Cities and towns in Apulia
Localities of Salento